Sarala Yeolekar is an actress of Marathi, Hindi and Gujarati cinema. She has acted in over 150 movies.

In Hindi movies, she is best known for her sexy dance in an item song in the movie Dance Dance (1987).

Selected plays and filmography

Films

 Saticha Vaan  (1969)
 Harya Narya Jindabad (1972)
 Pinjara (1972)
 Thapadya  (1973)
 Paandu Jamdaar (1977) (Gujarati version of the Marathi film Pandu Havaldar)
 Banya Bapu  (1977)
Jay Vejay (1977)
 Dhakati Mehuni (1978)
 Javayachi Jaat (1979)
 Zakol (1980)
 Shura Mi Vandile (1980)
 Jhatpat Karu De Khapat (1982)
 Raja Gopichanadan (1985) (Gujarati Movie)
 Gaav Ki Naar Gujaratani (1986) (Gujarati Movie)
 Dance Dance (1987)
Aaj Ke Angaare (1988)
Paap Ki Duniya (1988) as Sharada 
 Commando (1988)
 Meri Zabaan (1989)
 Love Love Love (1989)
Nachnewale Gaanewale (1991)
Nishchaiy (1992)
 Janmkundali (2003)

Play
 Ashi Vasti Ashi Manasa

See also
Marathi cinema

References

Actresses from Mumbai
Indian film actresses
Actresses in Marathi cinema
Actresses in Hindi cinema
Actresses in Gujarati cinema
20th-century Indian actresses
21st-century Indian actresses